The Woman Condemned is a 1934 American pre-Code film directed by Dorothy Davenport, best known as a silent actress and the wife of actor Wallace Reid.

Plot 
A radio star takes a vacation and is later found murdered. Barbara Hammond is accused of the murder and Jerry Beall tries to prove her innocence.

Cast 
Claudia Dell as Barbara Hammond
Lola Lane as Jane Merrick
Richard Hemingway as Jerry Beall
Jason Robards Sr. as Jim Wallace
Paul Ellis as Dapper Dan
Douglas Cosgrove as Police Chief
Mischa Auer as Dr. Wagner
Sheila Bromley as The Actress
Louise Beavers as Sally, Jane's Maid
Tom O'Brien as First Detective
Neal Pratt as Judge

External links 

1934 films
1934 romantic drama films
American mystery drama films
1934 crime drama films
American black-and-white films
American romantic drama films
1930s mystery drama films
American crime drama films
Films directed by Dorothy Davenport
1930s English-language films
1930s American films